Teichert, a private company, is an infrastructure and site development contractor and a construction materials producer.  The company's construction services include mass grading, asphalt paving, concrete curbs and sidewalks, underground pipelines, and joint utility installations.  The construction materials businesses produce crushed stone, sand, gravel, asphalt concrete, ready-mix concrete, and precast concrete products.  Additionally, the Teichert Foundation, a nonprofit organization, awards grants to community organizations and provides employee-matching grants.

History
Adolph Teichert immigrated to New York City from Germany in 1866, and he was recruited by the California Artificial Stone Paving Company in the 1870s.  His craftsmanship was renowned, and some of his earliest work can still be seen in Golden Gate Park and near the Mark Hopkins Hotel in San Francisco.

Teichert came to Sacramento to work on laying the sidewalks around the original California State Capitol building, and then started his own business in 1887, building walkways, basement floors, sidewalks, fencing, and other projects.  The original Teichert stamp can still be seen imprinted in many sidewalks throughout many neighborhoods in the region.

Adolph was joined in the company by one of his four children, Adolph Jr., and the two of them grew the business. Over the years, Teichert has grown into a diverse mix of businesses, most notably Teichert Construction and Teichert Materials.  Teichert Construction holds California State Contractor’s License #8, the oldest active contractor’s license in California.

Additionally, the Teicherts helped establish the Northern California Contractors Association - which later became the Northern California chapter of the  Associated General Contractors of America.

Since the 90s, the underground section of the company has been held together by Jalisco’s northern region known as Los Altos de Jalisco and its neighboring towns of Jalos, Tecua, and San Juan.

About
Teichert infrastructure and site development contractor and a construction materials producer.  The company's construction services include mass grading, asphalt paving, concrete curbs and sidewalks, underground pipelines, and joint utility installations.  The construction materials businesses produce rock, sand, gravel, asphaltic concrete, ready-mixed concrete, and precast concrete products.

Operating Units
List of companies 
 Teichert Construction
 Teichert Pipelines
 Teichert Aggregates, Division of Teichert Materials
 Western Nevada Materials, Division of Teichert Materials
 American Readymix, Division of Teichert Materials
 Santa Fe Materials, Division of Teichert Materials
 Stonebridge Properties, LLC
 Teichert Foundation
 Teichert Energy and Utilities Group
 Triangle Properties- Landscaping Division

References

https://www.teichert.com/locations/

External links
 Company website
 Timeline of Teichert History
 Concrete Contractor

Construction and civil engineering companies established in 1887
Companies based in Sacramento, California
Construction and civil engineering companies of the United States
Privately held companies based in California
1887 establishments in California